Micromacromia is a genus of dragonflies in the family Libellulidae.

The genus contains the following species:
Micromacromia camerunica  - Large Micmac, widespread in central Africa
Micromacromia flava , Angola
Micromacromia miraculosa , Tanzania
Micromacromia zygoptera  - Small Micmac, widespread in west Africa

References

Libellulidae
Anisoptera genera
Taxa named by Ferdinand Karsch
Taxonomy articles created by Polbot